List of coupé convertibles, also known as retractable hardtop, coupé cabriolet or roadster coupé.

Classic cars
 Peugeot 402 Éclipse Décapotable (1935)
 Chrysler Thunderbolt concept car 1941
 Playboy Convertible (1947–1951)
 Continental Mark II concept car c.1953
 Ford Fairlane 500 Skyliner (1957–1959)
 Ford Galaxie Skyliner (1959)
 Gaylord (1956)

Modern cars
 BMW Z4 (E89) (2009–2016)
 BMW 3 Series (E93) (2007-2013)
 Alpina B4 Bi-Turbo Convertible
 BMW M3 (2008-2013)
 BMW 4 Series (F33) (2013–2020)
BMW M4 (2014–2020)
 Alpina B4 Bi-Turbo Convertible
 Cadillac XLR (2004-2009)
 Chevrolet SSR (2003-2006)
 Chrysler Sebring/200 (2008-2014)
 Daihatsu Copen (2002)
 Ferrari California (2008-2013)
 Ferrari California T (2014-2017)
 Ferrari 458 Spider (2012-2015)
 Ford Focus CC (2007–2011)
 The Honda CR-X del Sol (was available only as option in Japan and Europe market.) (1992–1998)
 Hyundai CCS Concept, based on Tiburon/Tuscani/Coupe model, but never reached production. (2003)
 Infiniti G/Q60 Convertible (2009-2015)
 Lexus SC 430/Toyota Soarer (2001–2010)
 Lexus IS 250/350 C (2009–2015)
 Mazda MX-5 (2004-2006), was available only as option.
 Mazda MX-5 PRHT (2006–2014)
 McLaren MP4-12C Spider (2011-2014)
 McLaren 650S Spider (2014-2017)
 McLaren 675LT Spider (2014-2017)
 Mercedes-Benz SLK-Class, later SLC class (1996–2020)
 Mercedes-Benz SL-Class (2001–2020)
 Brabus SV12 S Biturbo Roadster (2006-2010)
 Brabus SL Roadster
 Mitsubishi GTO/3000GT Spyder (1995–1996)
 Mitsubishi Colt CZC (2006–2009)
 Nissan Micra C+C (2005–2010)
 Nissan Silvia Varietta (2000)
 Opel Astra TwinTop (2007–2010)
 Opel Tigra TwinTop (2004–2009)
 Peugeot 206 CC (2001-2007)
 Peugeot 307 CC (2003-2008)
 Peugeot 207 CC (2007-2015)
 Peugeot 308 CC (2009-2015)
 Peugeot 407 Macarena - Concept (2004)
 Peugeot 607 Paladine - Concept (2000)
 Pontiac G6 (2006–2009)
 Renault Mégane CC Mk.2 (2003-2009)
 Renault Mégane CC Mk.3 (2010-2016)
 Spyker C8 Aileron Spyder
 Spyker C8 Spyder SWB
 Spyker C8 Spyder T
 Spyker C8 Spyder GT2-R
 Toyota Soarer Aerocabin (1989)
 Volkswagen Eos (2006–2015)
 Volvo C70 Mk.2 (2006-2013)

Current cars 

Chevrolet Corvette (C8) (2020–present)
Ferrari Portofino (2018–present)
Ferrari 488 Spider (2015–present)
Mazda MX-5 RF (2016–present)
McLaren 570S Spider (2017–present)
McLaren 600LT Spider (2019–present)
McLaren 720S Spider (2019–present)

References

Coupe